Linoleate 8R-lipoxygenase (linoleic acid 8R-dioxygenase, 5,8-LDS (bifunctional enzyme), 7,8-LDS (bifunctional enzyme), 5,8-linoleate diol synthase (bifunctional enzyme), 7,8-linoleate diol synthase (bifunctional enzyme), PpoA) is an enzyme with systematic name linoleate:oxygen (8R)-oxidoreductase. This enzyme catalyses the following chemical reaction

 linoleate + O2  (8R,9Z,12Z)-8-hydroperoxyoctadeca-9,12-dienoate

Linoleate 8R-lipoxygenase contains heme.

References

External links 
 

EC 1.13.11